Cyphelium is a genus of crustose areolate lichens with cup-like apothecia filled with sooty black spores. The genus is in the family Caliciaceae . The genus has a widespread distribution, especially in north and south temperate regions, and contains about 12 species. Members of the genus are commonly called soot lichens.

Species
Cyphelium brachysporum
Cyphelium brunneum
Cyphelium chloroconium
Cyphelium inquinans
Cyphelium karelicum
Cyphelium lecideinum
Cyphelium lucidum
Cyphelium marcianum
Cyphelium notarisii
Cyphelium pinicola
Cyphelium sessile
Cyphelium tigillare
Cyphelium trachylioides

References

Gallery

Caliciales
Lichen genera
Taxa described in 1815
Taxa named by Erik Acharius
Caliciales genera